Anna Olasz (born 19 September 1993) is a Hungarian swimmer. She competed in the women's marathon 10 kilometre event at the 2016 Summer Olympics. In 2020, she won the silver medal in the women's 10 km event at the 2020 European Aquatics Championships held in Budapest, Hungary, and the bronze medal in the team relay event.

References

External links
 

1993 births
Living people
Hungarian female long-distance swimmers
Olympic swimmers of Hungary
Swimmers at the 2016 Summer Olympics
Sportspeople from Szeged
Swimmers at the 2010 Summer Youth Olympics
Universiade medalists in swimming
Universiade gold medalists for Hungary
Medalists at the 2017 Summer Universiade
European Aquatics Championships medalists in swimming
World Aquatics Championships medalists in open water swimming